The Ministry of Justice of Ukraine is the main body in the system of central government of Ukraine that regulates state legal policy. It is often abbreviated as "Мinjust" [of Ukraine]. It is one of the oldest ministerial offices of the country tracing its history back to the beginning of 20th century.

Main objectives
 Ensuring realization of the state legal policy and the policy in the sphere of adaptation of the legislation of Ukraine to the legislation of the European Union.
 Preparation of propositions in conducting legal reforms and promoting development of a legal science.
 Ensuring the protection of rights and freedoms of a human and a citizen in the specific field.
 Preparation of propositions in improvement of legislation, its systematization, development of projects of legal acts and international agreements of Ukraine in legal affairs, conducting a legal expertise of projects of legal acts, state registration of legal acts, maintaining the Unified state registry of such acts.
 Planning by the proposals of other central bodies of executive power of legislative proceedings and actions in adaptation of the legislation of Ukraine to the legislation of the European Union.
 Coordination of actions in implementation of the National program in adaptation of the legislation of Ukraine to the legislation of the European Union.
 Organization of implementing the decisions of judges and other authorities (officials) according to the laws, working with human resources, expert support of justice.
 Organization of notary performance and the authorities in registration of acts of civil status.
 Developing a legal informativeness and forming in citizens a legal outlook.
 Fulfilling an international legal cooperation.

Structure

The ministry consists of the central body of ministry headed by its leadership composed of a minister, his/hers first deputy, and other deputies in assistance to the minister. To the central body of ministry also belongs the government official in affairs of the European Court of Human Rights, who represents Ukraine in the mentioned international institution. The ministry regulates and controls activities of notaries (legal law representatives and executives) in Ukraine.

There are several state departments and agencies that are assigned to the leadership of the ministry, each deputy of which is also assigned a territorial representation of local authorities of justice.

 State Archive Service of Ukraine
 State Executive Service of Ukraine
 State Penitentiary Service of Ukraine
 The agency, headquartered in Kyiv, operates the country's prisons.
 State Registration Service of Ukraine
 State Service of Ukraine for protection of personal data

List of Ministers of Justice and historical outlook 

 At the end of 1917 the Russian Social Democratic Labour Party established an oppositional government in Kharkiv, the People's Secretariat, a respective secretariat of which was headed by Vladimir Lyuksemburg. Some other secretaries of that government Yevgeniy Tereletsky and Mykola Skrypnyk later also have served as ministers of justice.
 On November 28, 1919, the newly established Communist Party (Bolsheviks) of Ukraine created a new government, the Temporary Workers-Peasants Government, again in the opposition to the acting government in Ukraine. On January 29, 1919, it was replaced with the People's Commissariat of the Ukrainian SSR.
 With securing of the Soviet power in Ukraine after 1920 and until 1936 the People's Commissar of Justice (Narkom) performed also the role of the Prosecutor General of the republic.
 Yevgeniy Tereletsky as the former People's Commissar of Justice in 1923 was an ambassador representing the Ukrainian SSR in the Baltic states.

See also
European Court of Human Rights
Cabinet of Ministers of Ukraine
Justice ministry
Ministry of Justice (Soviet Union)
Prosecutor General of Ukraine, Supreme Council of Justice (Ukraine)
Iryna Mudra

References

External links 
 Official Website of the Ukrainian Ministry of Justice

 
Justice
Ukraine
Constitution of Ukraine
Law of Ukraine